Girvan Old railway station was a terminus station opened in Girvan, in Carrick, South Ayrshire, Scotland by the Maybole and Girvan Railway. Although ambitions existed to extend the line through to Stranraer it was built on a site that would not permit this and so when the line was built the Girvan New station was opened on 5 October 1877 by the Girvan and Portpatrick Junction Railway on the route to Pinmore and eventually through to Stranraer railway station.

History 

The original Girvan terminus station was situated adjacent to the goods station that was established at the site. It was opened by the Maybole and Girvan Railway with only one short platform in 1860 and was retained as  a goods station in 1877 by the Glasgow and South Western Railway who took over the running of the line to Stranraer. The Girvan New station was further from the town and this was not popular with passengers and it appears that trains called at either station for a short period of time. Girvan Old Station closed to regular passenger traffic on 1 April 1893 and the goods station remained in use. Another source states that Girvan New station at first only catered for the workings continuing south to Stranraer.

The remnants of the old station platform were still present in 1988 and were even visible in 2017 many years after the track was lifted.

Station and goods station infrastructure

Girvan Old had a single platform. The goods station had a number of buildings including a turntable, water column, weighing machines, engine shed that closed in 1940 and a coal yard with a bridge over the River Girvan that led to the harbour and jetty. The track was still in situ in 1989 however it had been lifted by 2014. The old Girvan terminus went out of use in the 1980s due to the poor condition of the wooden bridge over the River Girvan although ballast trains were still making use of the site.

Harbour branch
The Glasgow and South-Western Railway built a line to the harbour from the goods station that involved a second bridge over the River Girvan and at the harbour jetty coal was emptied down a chute into waiting colliers that took the coal to Ireland. A network of sidings and two waggon turntables existed here. This arrangement only lasted until 1918 with coal coming from the Bargany Pit.

References

Notes

Sources 
 Butt, R. V. J. (1995). The Directory of Railway Stations: details every public and private passenger station, halt, platform and stopping place, past and present (1st ed.). Sparkford: Patrick Stephens Ltd. .
 
 Wham, Alasdair (2013). Ayrshire's Forgotten Railways. A Walker's Guide. Usk : Oakwood Press. .

External links
 Video footage of Girvan Old railway station
 Railscot on the Maybole and Girvan Railway
 Video footage of the old Girvan Harbour Branch
 Video footage of the old Girvans Goods Station

Disused railway stations in South Ayrshire
Railway stations in Great Britain opened in 1860
Railway stations in Great Britain closed in 1893
Former Glasgow and South Western Railway stations
Girvan